Suppressyn (SUPYN) is a protein that in humans is encoded by the ERVH48-1 (endogenous retrovirus group 48 member 1) gene.

Suppressyn is expressed in embryos before implantation in the placenta, and also in the placenta. It was originally a gene for a viral coat protein that has become stabily integrated within the genomes of humans and other hominids.  The function of this endogenous retrovirus protein is possibly to protect against infection by mammalian type D retroviruses. This is one of hundreds of similar genes.

Suppressyn binds to the receptor for syncytin-1 in the trophoblast.

References